Nepeta grandiflora is a species of flowering plant in the mint family Lamiaceae, native to the Caucasus. Species of Nepeta are called catnip or catmint, with reference to their reported effect on some domestic cats. The plants seem to induce a euphoria in the animals, causing them to roll in the foliage and exhibit signs of intoxication.

N. grandiflora and its cultivars are widely grown as ornamental garden plants which are useful for the middle of a flower border in full sun. The cultivar ‘Bramdean’ has gained the Royal Horticultural Society’s Award of Garden Merit.

References

Flora of the Caucasus
grandiflora